The  is a professional golf tournament on the Japan Golf Tour. Founded in 2000, it is one of the four major championships on the tour.

Tournament hosts
The Japan Golf Tour Championship has been played at Shishido Hills Country Club since 2003. From 2000 to 2002, it was played at Horai Country Club.

Prize money
Prize money was ¥120,000,000 from 2000 to 2005 and has been ¥150,000,000 since 2006, except for 2010 when it was ¥120,000,000. In 2000 the weather shortened the event to 54 holes and the prize money was reduced by 25% from ¥120,000,000 to ¥90,000,000.

Winners 

Note: Green highlight indicates scoring records.

See also
Japan PGA Championship
Japan Open Golf Championship
Golf Nippon Series JT Cup

Notes

External links 
Coverage on the Japan Golf Tour's official site

Japan Golf Tour events
Golf tournaments in Japan
Sport in Ibaraki Prefecture
Recurring sporting events established in 2000
2000 establishments in Japan
Mori Building